The women's shot put event at the 2005 Summer Universiade was held on 16 August in Izmir, Turkey.

Results

References

Athletics at the 2005 Summer Universiade
2005 in women's athletics
2005